Developing Story is a 2017 album arranged by Alan Broadbent and performed by the London Metropolitan Orchestra. The album received five stars in a review at All About Jazz.

Track listing
 All music by Alan Broadbent unless otherwise stated
 "Developing Story: Movement 1" – 9:49
 "Developing Story: Movement 2" – 7:11
 "Developing Story: Movement 3" – 9:18
 "If You Could See Me Now" (Tadd Dameron) – 6:35
 "Naima" (John Coltrane) – 8:28
 "Blue in Green" (Miles Davis) – 8:06
 "Lady in the Lake" – 4:34
 "Milestones" (Davis) – 5:02
 "Children of Lima" – 6:22

Personnel
Alan Broadbent – arranger, conductor
Harvie S – double bass
Peter Erskine – drums
The London Metropolitan Orchestra

References

2017 albums
Alan Broadbent albums
Instrumental albums
Universal Records albums